Zou Yu (born 10 October 1920 in Bobai County, Guangxi) is a politician of the People's Republic of China.

Biography 
He was the Minister of Justice from 1983 to 1988. He was also the President of the China University of Political Science and Law from 1984 to 1988.

External links
 Biography of Zou Yu

1920 births
Living people
People from Yulin, Guangxi
People's Republic of China politicians from Guangxi
Academic staff of China University of Political Science and Law
Educators from Guangxi
Chinese Communist Party politicians from Guangxi
Ministers of Justice of the People's Republic of China
Chinese centenarians
Men centenarians